Milton Lee Childs is an American attorney and judge.  He has served as a Wisconsin Circuit Court Judge in Milwaukee County since 2019.

Life and career 
Childs served in the U.S. Marine Corps Reserve for 8 years, earning the rank of sergeant. He subsequently worked a math teacher for 12 years.
Childs graduated from the Marquette University Law School in 2003. After law school, Childs worked at the Wisconsin State Public Defenders Office, where he rose to become a managing attorney.
In 2019, Governor Tony Evers appointed Childs to the circuit court after he appointed his predecessor, Joe Donald, to the Wisconsin Court of Appeals. He was elected in 2021 after running unopposed.

References

External links

 Milton Childs at Ballotpedia

People from Milwaukee County, Wisconsin
Wisconsin lawyers
Wisconsin state court judges
21st-century American judges
Living people
Year of birth missing (living people)